Western Folklore is a quarterly academic journal for the study of folklore published by the Western States Folklore Society (formerly the California Folklore Society). It was established in 1942 as the California Folklore Quarterly and obtained its current name in 1947. It is indexed in JSTOR.

Abstracting and indexing 
The journal is abstracted and indexed in Historical Abstracts, Humanities Index, Music Index, Prepublication Online Data System, and Arts and Humanities Search.

External links 
 

Publications established in 1942
Folklore journals
Quarterly journals
English-language journals
1942 establishments in California